Lazar Poptraykov (Bulgarian: Лазар Поптрайков; Macedonian: Лазар Поп-Трајков; 10 April 1878–October 1903) was a Macedonian Bulgarian revolutionary (komitadji). He was also a Bulgarian Exarchate teacher and poet from Ottoman Macedonia. He was one of the leaders of the Internal Macedonian-Adrianople Revolutionary Organization (IMARO) in the region of Kastoria (Kostur) during the Ilinden Uprising. Despite his Bulgarian identification, per the post-WWII Macedonian historiography he was as an ethnic Macedonian.

Life 

Lazar Poptraykov was born in Dambeni, Ottoman Empire (now Dendrohori, Greece) on 10 April 1878. He studied at the local village school before moving to the Bulgarian junior high school in Kostur. Later he continued to study at the Bitola Bulgarian Classical High School and afterwards at Thessaloniki's Bulgarian Men High School. In Thessaloniki, one of his teachers was Pere Toshev. Poptraykov joined IMARO as early as 1895, inspired by Dame Gruev. He finished the Bulgarian Men's High School of Thessaloniki in 1898, though he had started touring the Kastoria region to promote the work of IMARO two years earlier, in 1896.

Poptraykov was one of the founders of the Kastoria branch of IMARO. On 21 June 1903 he wrote a poem titled Lokvata and Vinyari to commemorate the battle of Lokvata between Bulgarian revolutionaries and Ottoman troops in Dendrohori during the Ilinden Uprising. His poem had large impact on the national identification of the villagers of Dendrohori whose allegiance to Bulgaria increased during the following years. Poptraykov was arrested by Ottoman authorities and imprisoned in Korçë along with fellow revolutionaries Manol Rozov, Maslina Grancharova, and Pavel Christov.

Death

Poptraykov died at the end of the Ilinden Uprising when he was assassinated by Konstantinos Christou, a fighter for Greek interests and was acting under orders by Germanos Karavangelis, bishop of Kastoria. Per Karavangelis, Poptraykov was the worst enemy of Hellenism, who fanatized the peasants in favor of the Bulgarian national idea. Christou who switched the side from Bulgarians to Greeks and vice versa, was received back by the IMRO at the insistence of Poptraykov. However, after Poptraykov had been wounded and taken a refuge with Kottas, he used the opportunity to kill him and present his head to Karavangelis who took a picture of the head on his desk.

Literature 
 Лазар Поптрайков - "Възстанието в Костурско; от 20 юлий до 30 август вкл.", публикувано в "Бюлетин на в. Автономия; Задграничен лист на Вътрешната македоно-одринска организация", брой 44-47, София, 1903 година Report about the Ilinden uprising written by Lazar Poptraykov, Vasil Chakalarov, Manol Rozov, Pando Klyashev and Mihail Nikolov

Sources 

1878 births
1903 deaths
Bulgarians from Aegean Macedonia
Members of the Internal Macedonian Revolutionary Organization
Bulgarian revolutionaries
Bulgarian educators
20th-century Bulgarian poets
Bulgarian male poets
Prisoners and detainees of the Ottoman Empire
Bulgarian people imprisoned abroad
Macedonian Bulgarians
Bulgarian Men's High School of Thessaloniki alumni
Assassinated Bulgarian people
Bulgarian people murdered abroad
People murdered in the Ottoman Empire
19th-century poets
19th-century male writers
20th-century male writers
People from Kastoria (regional unit)
1903 murders in the Ottoman Empire